William Johnston Dawson (1765 – January 16, 1796) was a U.S. Congressman from the state of North Carolina from 1793 to 1795 and a member of the North Carolina House of Commons.

Early life
Dawson was born near Edenton in Chowan County, North Carolina. His grandfather was royal Governor Gabriel Johnston. He was also the grandson of William Dawson, the second president of The College of William & Mary, and a great-great grandson of John Stith and William Randolph.

Political career
Dawson represented Bertie County in the state constitutional conventions of 1788 and 1789. He was elected to the North Carolina House of Commons (now called the House of Representatives) in 1791 and was a member of the committee which was appointed to choose a site for the new state capital, Raleigh, that same year. Dawson Street in downtown Raleigh is named for him. Dawson was elected to the 3rd United States Congress in the election of February 15, 1793, a three-way race in which he, as the Anti-Federalist candidate, defeated two Federalists: Stephen Cabarrus (Speaker of the State House) and William Cumming. Dawson served from March 4, 1793 to March 3, 1795. He lost his race for re-election on February 13, 1795 to Dempsey Burges.

Death
Dawson died in Bertie County, North Carolina. His obituary, printed in the North Carolina Journal on February 1, 1796, stated that Dawson died on January 16, 1796 but the Biographical Directory of the United States Congress, which lists his middle name as "Johnson," puts his death at 1798.

References

1765 births
1796 deaths
Members of the North Carolina House of Representatives
Members of the United States House of Representatives from North Carolina
People from Edenton, North Carolina
18th-century American politicians
People from Bertie County, North Carolina